Tomaselli family is an illustrious family of condottiero and feudal lords from northern Italy, originally from Piacenza and then settled in Milan, Strigno and in the Province of Bergamo. Over the centuries, members of different branches of the family have been awarded knighthoods in various orders of chivalry.  A branch of the family that settled in Austria still exists and produced many noted artists during the late 18th and 19th centuries.

History 
The first document of the family dates back to the beginning of the 12th century. The founder of the family, Luigi Tomaselli, was decorated with the title of Knight in 1113 by the Margravine Matilda of Tuscany after having distinguished himself in the battles against Henry IV, Holy Roman Emperor, who was an enemy of Pope Gregory VII, in 1092. Cosimo Tomaselli, Luigi's nephew, fought with the Lombard League against Frederick Barbarossa in Legnano. Economic fortune came immediately thanks to the wool trade and the entry into local politics of the family. They moved to the fiefdoms of some territories and finally to the Archdiocese of Milan, where they stayed for centuries. Giacomo Tomaselli, a lawyer closely linked to the ruling House of Sforza, was appointed Grand Chancellor of the Duchy of Milan in 1537. 

In the late seventeenth century, the Tomaselli family were sent by the Republic of Venice to the Province of Bergamo, under the rule of Doge Silvestro Valier, to control the Venetian possessions that surrounded the river Serio. They settled permanently in the Bergamo area, near the areas of the Serio river where they controlled, through their fiefs, the southwestern borders of the Venetian republic. 

In the mid-eighteenth century, the most important branch of the  became extinct, which put an end to the prominency of the entire family.

Title of Count 
Luigi Sergio Tomaselli, already blazoned and enrolled in the nobility of Bergamo, that is inherited only by the principle of primogeniture.

Austrian branch 
It is descended from Giuseppe Tomaselli (1758–1836), who was born in Rovereto in the Prince-Bishopric of Trent, which later in his lifetime belonged to Austria and which is now in Italy. After studying music in Milan, he immigrated to Salzburg in 1781 to become a noted singer in court chapel of Hieronymus of Colloredo, Prince-Bishop of Salzburg. After, he became music teacher in Salzburg and in Vienna. Giuseppe (Joseph) Tomaselli was married to Antonia Honikel (1775–1846), a native of Landersdorf. They were the parents of Franz Tomaselli (1801–1846), who was a noted actor and comedian in Vienna; of Karl Tomaselli (1809–1887), who founded a famous coffee shop in Salzburg which still exists; of Ignaz Tomaselli (1812–1862), who was a prominent comedian and singer; and of Katharina Tomaselli (1811–1857), who was an opera singer and who was the mother of the actress and theatre director Josefine Gallmeyer (1838–1884).

One prominent member of the family is historian Sylvana Tomaselli, the wife of George Windsor, Earl of St Andrews, and daughter-in-law of Prince Edward, Duke of Kent. Her father Maximilian Karl Tomaselli was born in Salzburg and descends from a branch of the family that moved to Salzburg and was founded by Giuseppe Tomaselli.

Notable members 
 
 Giuseppe Tomaselli, noted opera singer
 Sylvana Tomaselli, Countess of St Andrews, by marriage member of the House of Windsor

References

Austrian families
Tomaselli family
Italian-language surnames
Surnames of South Tyrolean origin